Sarah Jolly (born 1 February 1992) is an Australian rules footballer who played for the Melbourne Football Club in the AFL Women's competition. She was drafted by Melbourne with their nineteenth selection and 145th overall in the 2016 AFL Women's draft. She made her debut in the nineteen point win against  at Ikon Park in round two of the 2017 season. She was not retained on Melbourne's list at the end of the season and was subsequently delisted in May 2017.

References

External links 

1992 births
Living people
Melbourne Football Club (AFLW) players
Australian rules footballers from Victoria (Australia)
Victorian Women's Football League players